Fudenjan (also Romanized as Fūdenjān and Fūdanjān; also known as Fooranjan, Fūtenjān, and Patān Jū) is a village in Zibad Rural District, Kakhk District, Gonabad County, Razavi Khorasan Province, Iran. At the 2006 census, its population was 263, in 87 families.

References 

Populated places in Gonabad County